Camarillas is a municipality located in the province of Teruel, Aragon, Spain. According to the 2018 census (INE), the municipality has a population of 86 inhabitants.

Population

References

Municipalities in the Province of Teruel